NGC 6144 is a globular cluster in the constellation Scorpius, located almost exactly 1° away from its brighter counterpart globular cluster, Messier 4. It is relatively close and is partially obscured by Rho Ophiuchi cloud complex. The cluster has a very low core stellar density for a globular cluster and harbors a few X-ray radiation sources.

References

External links

Globular Clusters Database

Globular clusters
Scorpius (constellation)
6144